Baldwin II, also known as Baldwin of Courtenay (late 1217 – October 1273), was the last Latin Emperor ruling from Constantinople.

Biography
Baldwin II was born in Constantinople (the only Latin emperor to be born there), a younger son of Yolanda of Flanders, sister of the first two emperors, Baldwin I and Henry of Flanders. Her husband, Peter of Courtenay, was third emperor of the Latin Empire, and had been followed by his son Robert of Courtenay, on whose death in 1228 the succession passed to Baldwin, then an 11-year-old boy.

The barons chose John of Brienne as emperor-regent for life. Baldwin was also to marry Marie of Brienne, daughter of John and his third wife Berenguela of Leon, and on John's death to enjoy the full imperial sovereignty. The marriage contract was carried out in 1234. Since the death of Baldwin's uncle Emperor Henry in 1216, the Latin Empire had declined and the Byzantine (Nicene) power advanced; and the hopes that John of Brienne might restore it were disappointed.

The realm Baldwin governed was little more than the city of Constantinople. He adopted the Byzantine title of porphyrogenetos. His financial situation was desperate, and his life was chiefly occupied in begging at European courts. He went to the West in 1236, visited Rome, France and Flanders, trying to raise money and men to recover the lost territory of his realm. In 1237, with the support of the King of France and the Countess of Flanders, he chased his sister Margaret from power to become the next Count of Namur. But Baldwin was practically never present, and after the invasion and conquest of Namur by Henry V, Count of Luxembourg in 1256, he sold the rights on the county to his cousin Guy, Count of Flanders.

In around March 1238, Baldwin II's regency council pawned the Crown of Thorns to the Venetian Podestà of Constantinople for 13,134 hyperpera from a "consortium of creditors". His efforts met with success, and in 1240 he returned to Constantinople (through Germany and Hungary) at the head of a considerable army. Circumstances hindered him from accomplishing anything with this help, and in 1245 he traveled again to the West, first to Italy and then to France, where he spent two years. The empress Marie and Philip of Toucy governed during his absence. He was happy to be able to get money from King Louis IX in exchange for relics. In 1249 he was with King Louis at Damietta.

The extremity of his financial straits reduced him soon afterwards to handing over his only son, Philip, to Venetian merchants as a pledge for loans of money. Philip was later redeemed by Alfonso X of Castile. The rest of his reign was spent by Baldwin in mendicant tours in western Europe.

On the night of 24 July 1261, a group of soldiers under Alexios Strategopoulos managed to enter Constantinople through a secret passageway and captured the city. Baldwin was asleep in the Blachernae Palace when the noise of the fighting awoke him; upon seeing the Byzantine troops advance upon him, he fled in such haste that he left his crown and sceptre behind him. Baldwin made his way to the harbor where he boarded a Venetian galley to Negropont. From there he proceeded to Athens, thence to Apulia, finally to France. As titular emperor, his role was still the same, to beg help from the western powers. In 1267 he went to Italy; his hopes were centred on Charles of Anjou. Charles seriously entertained the idea of conquering Constantinople, though his efforts were destroyed during the Sicilian Vespers, an event perhaps engineered by Michael VIII Palaeologus of Constantinople. To this intent, he signed the Treaty of Viterbo with Baldwin (May 1267). During the next year Baldwin and his son Philip lived on pensions from Charles. In October 1273 Philip married Beatrice, daughter of Charles, at Foggia. A few days later Baldwin died in Naples. Under Baldwin II, Constantinople's population had fallen to a mere 35,000 people.

Ancestors

References

Sources

 

 
 Harris, Jonathan, Byzantium and the Crusades, Bloomsbury, 2nd ed., 2014. 
 
 
 
 

1217 births
1273 deaths
13th-century Latin Emperors of Constantinople
Christians of the Crusades
Capetian House of Courtenay
Margraves of Namur
Medieval child monarchs
13th-century monarchs in Europe